Denzil Williams (born 17 October 1938) is a former Wales international rugby union player. He was capped 36 times for Wales between 1963 and 1971, including Wales' first overseas tour in 1964. He played in the Welsh rugby team's first match outside Europe and its first in the Southern Hemisphere; played against East Africa in Nairobi on 12 May 1964, Wales winning 8-26.  He was also selected fives times for the British & Irish Lions in 1966. His first international match was in the Five Nations tournament on 19 January 1963.  Williams also played club rugby for Ebbw Vale.

References

1938 births
Living people
Barbarian F.C. players
British & Irish Lions rugby union players from Wales
Ebbw Vale RFC players
Rugby union players from Blaenau Gwent
Rugby union props
Tredegar RFC players
Wales international rugby union players
Welsh rugby union players